Kolbjørn Almlid (born 2 June 1945) is a Norwegian businessperson and politician for the Centre Party.

He hails from Verran. From 1989 to 1990, during Syse's Cabinet, he was appointed State Secretary in the Ministry of Petroleum and Energy. He served as a deputy representative to the Parliament of Norway from Nord-Trøndelag during the term 1989–1993. From 1991 to 1995 he was county mayor of Nord-Trøndelag. Outside politics, he was a director in the Norwegian Industrial and Regional Development Fund, later named Innovation Norway following a merger.

Almlid has chaired the Central Norway Regional Health Authority from 2006 to 2012, and Nord-Trøndelag Elektrisitetsverk, and was a board member of Vinmonopolet from 1998 to 2000. In 2011 he became chair of Statnett.

References

1945 births
Living people
Deputy members of the Storting
Mayors of places in Nord-Trøndelag
Centre Party (Norway) politicians
Innovation Norway people
Norwegian state secretaries
Norwegian businesspeople